Jezioro (meaning "lake" in Polish) may refer to the following villages:
Jezioro, Lower Silesian Voivodeship (south-west Poland)
Jezioro, Lublin Voivodeship (east Poland)
Jezioro, Masovian Voivodeship (east-central Poland)
Jezioro, Silesian Voivodeship (south Poland)
Jezioro, Warmian-Masurian Voivodeship (north Poland)